Bianca Hyslop is a New Zealand Māori dancer and choreographer. She is affiliated to Te Arawa and Ngāti Whakaue iwi.

Biography 
Hyslop completed a Bachelor of Performing Screen and Arts degree at Unitec Institute of Technology in 2009. She became a freelance dancer and joined Atamira Dance Company.

In 2016 Hyslop was the inaugural recipient of Dance Aotearoa New Zealand's Māori Choreolab in which  she was paired with mentor Merenia Gray. Also in 2016 Hyslop created a choreographic work called A Murmuration for The New Zealand Dance Company as part of their Emerging Choreographers programme. In 2019 she worked with Rosie Tapsell of Ngāti Whakaue and artist Rowan Pierce to co-create a dance piece, Pōhutu. Pōhutu was included in the 2019 Tempo Dance Festival and the 2019 Kia Mau Festival at the Hannah Playhouse.  At the 2021 Kia Mau Festival Hyslop, Pierce along with Tūī Matira Ranapiri Ransfield mounted an installation called Te Mauri o Pōhutu at the gallery in the Toi Pōneke Arts Centre.

References 

Living people
Unitec Institute of Technology alumni
New Zealand choreographers
21st-century New Zealand dancers
Ngāti Whakaue people
Te Arawa people
Year of birth missing (living people)